Linthorpe is a rural locality in the Toowoomba Region, Queensland, Australia.

Geography
Linthorpe is on the Darling Downs.

Mount Haystack, Majuba Hill and Dummies Mountain are all located in Linthorpe.

Road infrastructure
The Toowoomba–Cecil Plains Road runs along the northern boundary, and the Oakey-Pittsworth Road runs along the north-western.

The Gore Highway marks the southern boundary of Linthorpe.

History
Motley Provisional School opened on 12 March 1900 and closed on 20 May 1960. In January 1901 it was renamed Linthorpe Provisional School. On 1 Jan 1909 it became Linthorpe State School. The school closed in 1960.

References

Toowoomba Region
Localities in Queensland